Cara Louise Theobold (born 8 January 1990) is an English actress who trained at the Guildhall School of Music and Drama. Her first acting role was as Ivy Stuart in the third and fourth series of the television period drama Downton Abbey; she is also known for her voice acting role as Tracer in the video game Overwatch.

Life and career
Theobold was educated at Outwood Grange Academy before attending the Guildhall School of Music and Drama. She auditioned for the Downton Abbey role of Ivy during the 2011 Christmas holidays in her final year there. She was allowed to finish her final year of drama school early to begin filming the series at Easter. Theobold characterised Ivy as "ambitious" and "a dreamer". She returned for the fourth series of the show in 2013. Her work on the series resulted in her being a co-recipient of the Screen Actors Guild Award for Outstanding Performance by an Ensemble in a Drama Series.

In 2014, Theobold made a guest appearance on the TV sitcom Lovesick (formerly known as Scrotal Recall). In 2015, she appeared in two episodes of Last Tango in Halifax as Holly, and in an episode of Call the Midwife. She next starred as Sarah, a housekeeper for a stately home, one of the main characters in the third series of The Syndicate, which aired in spring 2015. She is also the voice actress for Tracer in the video games Overwatch and Heroes of the Storm, and starred in the E4/Netflix original series Crazyhead alongside Susan Wokoma. In 2016, it was announced that Theobold would star in Absentia along with Stana Katic and Patrick Heusinger. In 2019, she appeared in ITV2 series Zomboat! as “fiery, feisty and very much the centre of her own universe” Jo, one of the show's main characters. In 2018, she played the part of Victoria Brown in the Polish film, 303 Squadron.

Filmography

Film

Television

Video games

References

External links
 
 

1990 births
Living people
Actors from Wakefield
Alumni of the Guildhall School of Music and Drama
21st-century English actresses
Actresses from Yorkshire
British people of French-Canadian descent
English film actresses
English television actresses
English video game actresses
English voice actresses